Tehuantepec District is located in the west of the Istmo Region of the State of Oaxaca, Mexico.
It includes the cities of Salina Cruz and Tehuantepec.

Gallery

Municipalities

The district includes the following municipalities:

References

Districts of Oaxaca
Istmo de Tehuantepec